The Patriotic Front was a nationalist electoral alliance in Bulgaria around the political parties IMRO – Bulgarian National Movement (IMRO) and National Front for the Salvation of Bulgaria (NFSB).

History
The former ran as part of an electoral alliance led by the political party Bulgaria Without Censorship (BBT) during the 2014 European parliamentary election, where both allied parties won a seat in the European parliament. The signing of a coalition agreement between IMRO and NFSB marks the end of the BBT-IMRO coalition. The Coalition agreement of the Patriotic Front was signed on 3 August 2014 and states its purpose to be for: "a revival of the Bulgarian economy, a fight against monopolies, achieving modern education and healthcare and a fair and uncorrupt judiciary."

The members of the alliance are - PROUD, National Ideal for Unity, Middle European Class, Association Patriot, Undivided Bulgaria, National Movement BG Patriot, Union of the Patriotic Forces "Defense", National Association of Alternate Soldiery "For the Honor of epaulette", National Movement for the Salvation of the Fatherland and National Democratic Party.

Elections
The coalition's electoral debut was in the early 2014 parliamentary election.

Statistics

See also
 Attack (political party)
 National Front (France)
 United Patriots Nationalist electoral alliance (2016-Since)

Further reading

References

2014 establishments in Bulgaria
Bulgarian nationalism
Defunct political party alliances in Bulgaria
Eastern Orthodox political parties
National conservative parties
Defunct nationalist parties
Defunct conservative parties
2017 disestablishments in Bulgaria
Right-wing parties in Europe
Political parties established in 2014
Political parties disestablished in 2017
Nationalist parties in Bulgaria
Conservative parties in Bulgaria